The Fujifilm X-H1 is a larger mirrorless interchangeable-lens digital camera announced on February 15, 2018, by Fujifilm. It has a backside-illuminated X-Trans CMOS III APS-C sensor and an X-Processor III processor that uses the Fujifilm X-mount. The X-H1 is a weather-resistant camera with an in-body image stabilization capable of recording 4K videos up to 30 fps with a color gamut at a bitrate of 200Mbit/s. The camera can record slow motion videos in 1080p at 120 fps.

The X-H1 is meant to begin a new line-up of larger DSLR-style mirrorless cameras. The camera is available only in black for $1,899.95. Sale began on 1 March 2018.

The X-H2S, announced on May 31, 2022, is the company's latest high-speed flagship model to succeed the X-H1. The X-H2, teased by the company on May 31, 2022 as well, will also succeed the X-H1.

Features 
The X-H1 is equipped with the sloped viewfinder 'prism', a top-panel LCD, and a significantly larger grip and buttons than the X-T series.

Key specifications 
 24MP X-Trans III APS-C sensor
 5-axis in-body image stabilization with 5EV rating
 3.69M-dot OLED viewfinder
 3.0 inch touchscreen LCD with two-axis tilt
 DCI and UHD 4K capture at up to 200 Mbit/s
 Slow motion 1080p (from 120 and 100 fps)
 Internal F-Log capture
 Reduced blackout in continuous shooting
 Twin UHS-II-compatible card slots
 Anti-flicker shooting mode
 Wi-Fi with Bluetooth for constant connection

References

External links 
 

X-H1
Cameras introduced in 2018